The Orlando governmentof Italy held office from 30 October 1917 until 23 June 1919, a total of 601 days, or 1 year, 7 months and 24 days.

Government parties
The government was composed by the following parties:

Composition

References

Italian governments
1917 establishments in Italy
1919 disestablishments in Italy